The Public Welfare Foundation distributes grants to organizations it believes it can contribute to reform. It has distributed more than $540 million in aid to 4,700 organizations. In 2013, it had total assets of $488.2 million and total giving of $20.2 million. Its average grant size is $148,324. These grants are awarded for both general and project support, but not for individuals, direct services, international projects, or endowment campaigns.

History
The foundation was overseen by Charles E. Marsh until 1953. His wife oversaw it from 1952 to 1974. It owned the Spartanburg Herald-Journal, The Tuscaloosa News, and The Gadsden Times. However, a 1969 federal tax law required non-profits to sell newspaper holdings, so the foundation had to sell these papers to The New York Times in 1985. In 2011, it added a special initiative to fund civil legal aid for the poor.

Activities
The Public Welfare Foundation gives grants to three main focus areas: criminal justice, juvenile justice, and worker's rights.

Its criminal justice program supports groups to end over-incarceration of adult offenders while also reducing racial disparities among the offenders. Grantees fitting under this scope include the American Civil Liberties Union Foundation and the Drug Policy Alliance.

Its juvenile justice program supports groups to end the sentencing of youth in the adult criminal justice system, expand the use of community-based programs for youth, promote fair and equitable treatment of youth of color, and support advancing state policies that restrict the use of incarceration by the juvenile justice system. Grantees that fit under this scope include the Campaign for Youth Justice and the Coalition for Juvenile Justice.

Its Workers' Rights program aims to improve the lives of low-wage working people. It seeks to advance reforms to prevent severe illness, injury, and death on the job, advance worker's rights in complex employment arrangements, and to hold employers accountable for wage theft. Grantees fitting under this scope include the Economic Policy Institute.

References

Organizations established in 1947
Foundations based in Washington, D.C.